Ian Cole (born 1989) is an American ice hockey player.

Ian Cole may also refer to:

Ian Cole (karateka), English karateka
Ian Cole (politician) (born 1947), Australian politician